The 2022 Oklahoma State Cowboys football team represented Oklahoma State University as a member of the  Big 12 Conference during the 2022 NCAA Division I FBS football season. Led by 18th-year head coach Mike Gundy, the Cowboys played home games at Boone Pickens Stadium in Stillwater, Oklahoma.

Preseason

Big 12 media poll
The preseason poll was released on July 7, 2022.

Award watch lists
Listed in the order that they were released

Preseason Big 12 awards
2022 Preseason All-Big 12 teams

Source:

Schedule
Oklahoma State and the Big 12 announced the 2022 football schedule on December 1, 2021.

Personnel

Game summaries

vs. Central Michigan

vs. Arizona State

vs.Arkansas - Pine Bluff

at No. 16 Baylor

vs. Texas Tech

at No. 13 TCU

vs. No. 20 Texas

at No. 22 Kansas State

at Kansas

vs. Iowa State

at Oklahoma

vs. West Virginia

vs. Wisconsin  (2022 Guaranteed Rate Bowl)

Rankings

References

Oklahoma State
Oklahoma State Cowboys football seasons
Oklahoma State Cowboys football